Hamide Ayşe Sultan ("praised" and "womanly"; also Ayşe Osmanoğlu; 15 November 1887 – 10 August 1960) was an Ottoman princess, the daughter of Sultan Abdul Hamid II and Müşfika Kadın.

Early life and education

Ayşe Sultan was born on 31 October 1887 in the Yıldız Palace. Her father was Sultan Abdul Hamid II, son of Sultan Abdulmejid I and Tirimüjgan Kadın. Her mother was Müşfika Kadın, daughter of Gazi Ağır Mahmud Bey and Emine Hanım. She was the only child of her mother.

Ayşe's education took place in a study room in the Lesser Chancellery of the Yıldız Palace, together with her elder half-sister Şadiye Sultan. Their instructors were the privy secretary Hasib Efendi and the Private Enciphering Secretary Kâmil Efendi. Hasib Efendi would give lessons in the Quran, Arabic, and Persian, while Kâmil Efendi was to teach Turkish reading and writing, Ottoman grammar, arithmetic, history, and geography.

Ayşe took her piano lessons from the hazinedar Dürrüyekta (who later became the wife of her eldest half-brother Şehzade Mehmed Selim). She was herself the student of François Lombardi (1865–1904), who had been hired as instructor to the Imperial Corps of Music and from whom Ayşe also took lessons once a week. She learned how to play the Hamidiye March (the anthem of the Ottoman Empire) and also composed lullabies.

First marriage
Ayşe Sultan was bethrothed to Ahmed Nami Bey, son of Fahri Bey, in 1908 during the last year of her father's reign. However, at the overthrew of her father in 1909, the princess followed her parents into exile at Thessaloniki. The next year she returned to Istanbul.

The marriage took place in June 1910 in the Dolmabahçe Palace, together with her half-sister Refia Sultan. The marriage ceremony was performed by Şeyhülislam Musa Kazım Efendi. The wedding reception took place two months later on 9 August 1910 in the Bebek Palace.

The couple's first child, a son, Sultanzade Ömer Nami Bey was born on 19 November 1911 in the Bebek Palace. He was followed by Aliye Namiye Hanımsultan born on 7 February 1913, who died at the age of two months on 9 April 1913. Before her father's death, Ayşe went to Switzerland, where the couple's third child, a son, Sultanzade Osman Nami Bey was born on 13 January 1918 in Geneva.

Divorce and second marriage
Ayşe Sultan and her husband divorced in 1921, when the princess met Colonel Yarbay Mehmed Ali Bey, son of Rauf Paşah, at a reception at Dolmabahçe Palace. The two fell in love and he left his wife and children to marry her. The first-born son wrote in his memoirs that, upon receiving the news, his mother could not stop crying. They married on 3 April 1921 in the Nişantaşı Palace. The two together had one son, Sultanzade Abdülhamid Rauf Bey born in 1921. At the exile of the imperial family in March 1924, Ayşe, her husband and children settled in Paris, near Versailles. She was widowed at her husband's death in 1937. Ayşe said her husband died because nostalgia. Her mother, on the other hand, chose to remain in Turkey, so that the two did not see one another for some 28 years, until the princess's return from exile in 1952. Because of the Surname Law, she took the name Ayşe Osmanoğlu.

Memoirs
Ayşe Sultan wrote her memoir in Istanbul after her return from exile, completing it by 1955. Ayşe, for large portions of the memoir she relied on the memory of her mother, as the two lived together the princess's return to Turkey. The work originally appeared in the serial format in the Turkish popular magazine Hayat in the late 1950s, followed by its publication as a book in Istanbul in 1960, shortly before the princess's death. The fact that the memoir was written as a magazine serial accounts for its format. She wrote with name Ayşe Osmanoğlu 

At its publication, the major attraction of the book lay in the princess's recollections of her famous parent. Recognizing this, she titled her memoir Babam Sultan Abdülhamid (Turkish for "My Father, Sultan Abdul Hamid"). In it she crafted a personal view of Abdul Hamid the man the father, a kind of personal vindication to counteract what she saw as the distorted public image of the controversial ruler whose 33-year reign ended in dethronement and vilification.

Death
Ayşe Sultan died on 10 August 1960 at the Serencebey Yokuşu, at the age of 72, and was buried in the imperial mausoleum at the Yahya Efendi dervish convent, adjacent to Yıldız Palace. Her mother survived her by nearly a year, dying in 1961.

Honours
 Iftikhar Sanayi Medal in Gold, 1897
 Order of the House of Osman
 Order of the Medjidie, Jeweled
 Order of Charity, 1st Class
 Liakat Medal in Gold
 Hicaz Demiryolu Medal in Gold

Issue 
From her first marriage, Ayşe Sultan had two sons and a daughter: 
 Sultanzade Omer Nami Bey (19 November 1911 - 17 March 1993). Born in Palace Bebek; died in Lausanne. He had two wives and one daughter:
Saadet Said Kamil. She was born on 21 September 1907, daughter of Said Kamil Bey and Fehime Fakhri Hanim. She died in Beirut on 13 August 1974. By her he had one daughter:
 Ayşe Rebia Nami (b. August 3, 1945)
Yolande Saad. They got married on 10 November 1975 in Istanbul.
 Aliye Namiye Hanımsultan (7 February 1913 - 9 April 1913). She died in infancy and was buried in  mausoleum of Şehzade Ahmed Kemaleddin, Yayha Efendi cemetery.
 Sultanzade Osman Nami Bey (13 January 1918 - 15 July 2010). Born in Geneva; died in Istanbul, and was buried in the mausoleum of Mahmud II;. He married twice and had five daughters:
Adile Tanyeri. They married on 18 January 1946 and she died on 8 August 1958 in Tunis. By her he had two daughters:
Mediha Şükriye Nami Osmanoğlu (b.24 May 1947). She has one daughter:
Ayşe Marie-Christine Nami-Conopio (b. 16 July 1969)
Fethiye Nimet Nami Osmanoğlu (b. 21 March 1957).
Rothraud Granzow. Born 9 April 1934 to Hoya Vesser, they married July 18, 1959. By her he had three daughters:
Ayşe Adile Nami Osmanoğlu (b. 6 August 1958). She has one son and one daughter:
Osman Necati Ferhat Ariba (b. 31 January 1980)
Ayşe Feyzan Ariba (b. 9 September 1983)
Gül Nür Dorothée Nami Osmanoğlu (b. 10 January 1960). She has one son and two daughters:
Hanzade Audrey Nami-Ragot (b. 4 February 1988)
Ayzade Maylis Nami-Ragot (b. 16 June 1991)
 Aléxis Cem Nami-Ragot (b. 11 March 1993)
Ayten Sofia Nami Osmanoğlu (b. 24 March 1961). She has one daughter:
Refia Roksan Kunter (b. 8 October 1984)

From her second marriage, Ayşe Sultan had one son:
 Sultanzade Abdülhamid Rauf Bey (October 1921 - March 11, 1981). Buried in Yayha Efendi Cemetery.

In popular culture
In the 2002 film Abdülhamid Düşerken, Ayşe Sultan is portrayed by Turkish actress Selin Demiratar.
In the 2011 TV series Kirli Oyunlar, Ayşe Sultan is portrayed by Turkish actress Sıla Çetindağ.

See also
 List of Ottoman princesses

Ancestry

References

Sources

External links
Biography of Hamide Ayşe Sultan 

Ayse
1887 births
1960 deaths
People from the Ottoman Empire of Abkhazian descent